The AMT AutoMag II is a semiautomatic handgun chambered in .22 WMR, that was manufactured by Arcadia Machine and Tool from 1987 until 1999, and is currently manufactured by High Standard.

Design
There were a number of engineering challenges to overcome in designing an autoloading .22 WMR handgun such as extraction problems.  The extraction problems stem from the fact that the slow burning rifle powder of the .22 WMR cartridge develops a late peak pressure.  This can cause the case mouth to expand and jam in the chamber when fired from a handgun.  AMT overcame this issue by drilling 18 holes at 90 degrees to the chamber.  A sleeve was then welded over the chamber; providing a tiny amount of clearance for the excess gas to escape from the first set of holes on back to the second set, thereby relieving the pressure enough to prevent the case from sticking.

The stainless steel slide has a large cutout over the barrel, similar to the Beretta M9, to facilitate better cooling and ejection of the spent brass casing (more likely it is simply to reduce the moving mass of the slide to allow for the blow-back operation).  The stainless steel construction throughout makes rust a non-issue.

See also
 AMT AutoMag III
 AMT AutoMag IV
 AMT AutoMag V
 Kel-Tec PMR-30: .22 magnum semiauto pistol

References

External links
High Standard Firearms

AMT semi-automatic pistols
Semi-auto magnum pistols